Seaside Park may refer to a number of places:

Municipalities
Seaside Park, British Columbia
Seaside Park, New Jersey

Parks
Seaside Park (Connecticut), Bridgeport, Connecticut, listed on the National Register of Historic Places (NRHP) in Fairfield County, Connecticut
Seaside Park (Marblehead, Massachusetts), listed on the NRHP in Essex County, Massachusetts
Seaside Park (Ventura) in Ventura, California